Ethel Wood may refer to:

 Ethel Shakespear (1871–1946), née Wood, English geologist, public servant and philanthropist
 Ethel Mary Wood (1876–1970), philanthropist